Cacotherapia unipuncta is a species of snout moth in the genus Cacotherapia. It was described by Harrison Gray Dyar Jr. in 1913, and is known from North America, including Pennsylvania, Tennessee and North Carolina.

References

Cacotherapiini
Moths described in 1913